Bykowski (Polish feminine: Bykowska; plural: Bykowscy) is a surname. It is related to a number of surnames in other languages.

Related surnames

People
 Carter Bykowski (born 1990), American football player
 Frank Bykowski (1915–1985), American football player
 Maciej Bykowski (born 1977), Polish footballer
 Ron Bykowski, American musician

See also
 

Polish-language surnames